Ancestral Quest (AQ) is a genealogy software application for Microsoft Windows developed by Incline Software, LC. It features data entry with sourcing capabilities and scrapbook extensions; a print engine for standard or custom charts and reports; a web page creator; a collaboration engine; and an extension tool for other genealogy databases.

Ancestral Quest was the first desktop genealogy software program to be certified to access, update, and synchronize with newer versions of FamilySearch.

Languages 
Developed in English, Ancestral Quest allows for translation to other languages using language modules. These user-created files allow Ancestral Quest screens and reports to be translated or customized. A user can create his or her own language module, or leverage the module of someone else. The Danish, French, German, Norwegian, and Spanish language modules are completely translated. The Chinese, Finnish, and Swedish language modules currently have all basic screens and reports translated.

Features 
 Creates a family tree, documenting sources and adding scrapbook items
 Researches the Internet with search engine interfaces
 Prints standard and custom charts, reports or books
 Creates web pages
 Imports and exports GEDCOM files
 Extends the use of other databases, such as Personal Ancestral File or FamilySearch
 Can be used on a flash drive
 Collaborate with other researchers, using a single master database 
 Can convert Personal Ancestral File (PAF) files

History

Version history 
 Ancestral Quest 1.0: 1994
 Ancestral Quest 1.1: 1995
 Ancestral Quest 2.0: 1996
 Ancestral Quest 2.1: 1997
 Ancestral Quest 3.0: 1999
 Ancestral Quest 10.0: 2002 - collaboration, research manager, global find/replace, PAF5.x support, fan charts, enhanced reporting
 Ancestral Quest 11.0: 2003 - memorize source citations, detailed change log, print to PDF, drop line charts, online IGI lookups
 Ancestral Quest 12.0: 2007 - individual summary screen, language translation, UNICODE
 Ancestral Quest 12.1: 2008 - link and sync with new FamilySearch, flash drive support
 Ancestral Quest 12.1: 2010 - Build 23 - Switched to FamilyTree API Version 2 for nFS, display age at marriage/death on family view, added ghost lines between children on family view, minor bug fixes
 Ancestral Quest 12.1: 2010 - Build 26 - Allows use of external viewer for photos, Improved Check/Repair, Assorted Bug Fixes
 Ancestral Quest 14.0: 2012 - Research Timeline, Color Coding, Tags, improvements to fan charts, FamilySearch Family Tree,  LDS features
 Ancestral Quest 14.0: 2015 - Mac Version available 19 August 2015 
 Ancestral Quest 15.0: 2016
 Ancestral Quest 16.0: 2019

AQ technology in other products 
In 1998, AQ was licensed for resale through Individual Software, and has been sold by them under the names of "Family Ties", "Family Trees Quick & Easy",  "Heritage Family Tree Deluxe",  and "Family Tree Heritage". In 1999, the AQ code was licensed to the LDS Church and became the base of the Windows versions of Personal Ancestral File. Millions of copies of PAF have been distributed. In 2001, the AQ code was licensed to Ancestry.com, and became the base of Ancestry Family Tree. Nearly a million copies of AFT were distributed.

Company history 
In 1998, Incline Software merged with The Hope Foundation. In 2001, this merger ended
 and Incline Software again became the custodian of AQ.

References

External links 
 
 AncestralQuest, Yahoo! Group

Windows-only genealogy software